The Calypso was a cruise liner owned by Louis Cruises, and was under charter to Thomson Cruises, part of TUI Travel at one time. Earlier names of the ship were Canguro Verde, Durr, Ionian Harmony, Sun Fiesta, Regent Jewel, Calypso and The Calypso.  In April 2013, it was beached in Alang, India, for scrapping.

Facilities
 4 bars, 2 restaurants, library w/ internet, bistro, disco, casino, library, swimming pool, fitness center, sauna, massage room, fashion shops. Cabin electricity supply 110 volts.
 243 cabins
 486 passengers on lower berths
 740 passengers including upper berths

Incidents
The crew put the fire out. The passengers meanwhile were assemble in the designated emergency stations, which however did not need to be launched. The fire caused extensive damage to the ship and she was out of action through the early part of the (northern hemisphere) summer cruising season.

External links
 Description of ship
 History of ship

References 

Ships of Celestyal Cruises
Ship fires
Maritime incidents in 2006
Ships built by Fincantieri
Ships built in Castellammare di Stabia
1967 ships